St. George's College (S.G.C.) in Cairo, Egypt, is a boys' school that offers the basic three stages of the pre-university education system in Egypt (primary, preparatory, and secondary education stages). The primary language of instruction is English; nevertheless, social sciences are taught in Arabic. In addition, French is also taught as a second foreign language.

History 
S.G.C. is one of the oldest private English language schools in Cairo, as it was established in September 1934. At that time it was located in Shubra. 

In 1950, it was amalgamated with the smaller St. Austin's School, and was transferred to Heliopolis (Cairo suburb) at Ismailia Square.

See also 

 :Category:St. George's College, Cairo alumni
 Education in Egypt

External links 
 http://www.saintgeorgecollege.com/
 http://www.stgeorgesoldies.com/
 http://www.myspace.com/sgcspace

Educational institutions established in 1934
Education in Cairo
Private schools in Cairo
1934 establishments in Egypt